Lazar Anić (Serbian Cyrillic: Лазар Анић; born 14 December 1991) is a Serbian athlete specialising in the long jump. He represented his country at the 2017 World Championships without qualifying for the final. Earlier he finished sixth at the 2017 European Indoor Championships.

His personal bests in the event are 8.15 metres (+2.0 m/s, Slovenska Bistrica 2017) and 7.98 metres (Belgrade 2017).

International competitions

References

1991 births
Living people
Serbian male long jumpers
World Athletics Championships athletes for Serbia
Athletes (track and field) at the 2022 Mediterranean Games
Mediterranean Games medalists in athletics
Mediterranean Games silver medalists for Serbia
21st-century Serbian people